KBOD (99.7 FM, The Boot) is a radio station broadcasting a country music format. Licensed to Gainesville, Missouri, United States, the station is currently owned by Mountain Lakes Broadcasting, Corp.

History
On March 1, 2012, KMAC changed their format from modern rock to sports, branded as "ESPN Arkansas", with programming from ESPN Radio. On October 5, 2012, KMAC changed their call letters to KBOD. In December, 2012 the station changed its format to country music as "99.7 The Boot".

Previous logo

References

External links

BOD